Omorgus squamosus is a beetle of the family Trogidae.

References 

squamosus
Beetles described in 1872